China participated in the 2017 Asian Winter Games in Sapporo and Obihiro, Japan, from February 19 to 26. China competed in all five sports (eleven disciplines). The Chinese delegation consisted of 236 people (156 athletes and 79 officials).

Short track speed skater Wu Dajing was the country's flagbearer during the parade of nations at the opening ceremony.

Background
One of the athletes' hotels was the APA Hotel in Sapporo. The founder and president of this hotel chain, Toshio Motoya, is a strong supporter of political and historical views aligned with those of Japan's right wing. For example, Motoya claimed that "Japanese aggression, the Nanking Massacre, and comfort women" were "fabricated stories" or "fictitious". His book is available in each of the guest rooms at the hotel. This created controversy, particularly in China, which caused the games organizers to ask the hotel to take appropriate actions and remove them from guest rooms. The Organizing Committee gained exclusive access over the hotel from February 12, and an organization committee official said, "we can decide what is removed and placed in the guest rooms so that we don’t place any items that offend athletes, from not only China, but also any other nation”. Eventually, both South Korea and China requested that their athletes stay at a different hotel, and the organizing committee obliged by changing their accommodations to the Sapporo Prince Hotel.

Medal summary

Medal table

Medalists

Competitors
The following table lists the Chinese delegation per sport and gender.

Alpine skiing

Biathlon

Cross-country skiing

Curling

China had entered both men's and women's teams.

Men's tournament

Liu Rui – Skip
Xu Xiaoming – Third
Ba Dexin – Second
Zang Jialiang – Lead
Zou Qiang – Alternate

Round-robin
China had a bye in draw 2

Draw 1 
Saturday, February 18, 9:00

Draw 3
Sunday, February 19, 9:00

Draw 4
Monday, February 20, 13:30

Draw 5
Tuesday, February 21, 9:00

Draw 6
Tuesday, February 21, 18:00

Semifinals
Wednesday, February 22, 1:30

Gold medal match
Friday, February 24, 1:30

Women's tournament

China's women's team consisted of five athletes.

Wang Bingyu – skip
Rui Wang – third
Liu Jinli – second
Zhou Yan – lead
Yang Ying – alternate

Round-robin
China had a bye in draw 2

Draw 1 
Saturday, February 18, 13:30

Draw 3
Sunday, February 20, 9:00

Draw 4
Monday, February 20, 18:00

Draw 5
Tuesday, February 21, 13:30

Figure skating

China's figure skating team consisted of twelve athletes.

Singles

Mixed

Freestyle skiing

Ice hockey

China had entered teams in both hockey tournaments. The men's team competed in the top division.

Men's tournament

China was represented by the following 23 athletes:

Sun Zehao (G)
Xia Shengrong (G)
Hu Tianyu (D)
Liang Wenbin (D)
Liu Qing (D)
Na Yungang (D)
Yang Mingxi (D)
Zhang Jiaqi (D)
Zhu Ziyang (D)
Chen Ling (F)
Cui Xijun (F)
Li Hang (F)
Li Tianhao (F)
Li Zhengyu (F)
Liu Wei (F)
Liu Yongshen (F)
Wang Chongwei (F)
Wang Chuxiong (F)
Xia Tianxiang (F)
Zhang Cheng (F)
Zhang Hao (F)
Zhang Wenqinghuai (F)
Zhang Zesen (F)

Legend
G– Goalie D = Defense F = Forward

Women's tournament

China was represented by the following 21 athletes:

He Siye (G)
Wang Yuqing (G)
Jiang Yue (G)
Deng Di (D)
Ju Jingwen (D)
Liu Zhixin (D)
Yu Baiwei (D)
Zhao Qinan (D)
Fang Xin (F)
Guan Yingying (F)
He Xin (F)
Jiang Bowen (F)
Kong Minghui (F)
Lu Shuang (F)
Lyu Yue (F)
Tian Naiyuan (F)
Wang Chang (F)
Wen Lu (F)
Zhang Chi (F)
Zhang Mengying (F)
Zhu Rui (F)

Legend
G– Goalie D = Defense F = Forward

Short track speed skating

Ski jumping

Snowboarding

Alpine
Men

Women

Halfpipe

Speed skating

References

Nations at the 2017 Asian Winter Games
Asian Winter Games
China at the Asian Winter Games